PSV Vrouwen (or PSV Women) is a Dutch women's football team representing PSV Eindhoven in the Eredivisie Vrouwen, the top women's league in the Netherlands. 

A founding member of the BeNe League in 2012, the team was known as PSV/FC Eindhoven and supported jointly by FC Eindhoven and PSV. Following the BeNe League's dissolution after the 2014–15 season, the team joined the Eredivisie as the women's team of PSV.

Domestic Seasons 

2019-20 season abandoned due to Covid.

Champions League 
PSV score is always first

Current squad

Out on loan

Head coaches
  Hesterine de Reus (2012)
  Nebojsa Vuckovic (2013–18)
  Sander Luiten (2018–20)
  Rick de Rooij (2020-)

Broadcasting
As of the 2020–21 season, league matches played on Sunday are broadcast on Fox Sports. Public service broadcaster NOS occasionally broadcasts some Sunday games live and provides game highlights during the Studio Sport programme.

References

 
PSV Eindhoven
BeNe League teams
Eredivisie (women) teams
2012 establishments in the Netherlands
Football clubs in Eindhoven
Association football clubs established in 2012